Sandee Chan; born 19 July 1970) is a Taiwanese singer-songwriter, music producer and director.

Early life 
Chan was born in the Philippines on 19 July 1970. Her family has Chinese roots, and she has Shanghai ancestry. Due to her father's factor, her family moved to Taiwan.

Chan holds a BA in journalism at National Chengchi University.

Career 
Chan began playing the piano as a child and created her own songs while a student at National Chengchi University in Taiwan. She was signed by an independent record label after performing on university music contest Young Star in 1991, and wrote songs for Jeff Chang and Huang Pin-Yuan before releasing her debut single and album in 1994. She has released 14 solo albums.

Studio albums
1994: Washington Chopped Down the Cherry Tree (華盛頓砍倒櫻桃樹)
1995: Leaving on a Jet Plane (乘噴射機離去)
1996: Sing till the End of the World (四季)
1999: I’m Not the Kind of Girl (我從來不是幽默的女生)
2000: Perfect Moan (完美的呻吟)
2004: Then, We All Wept (後來 我們都哭了)
2008: What If It Matters (如果有一件事是重要的)
2011: I Love You, John 
2013: A Low-Key Life (低調人生) 
2015: When Sorrow Being Downloaded Twice (如同悲傷被下載了兩次) 
2017: Martial God Cardea (戰神卡爾迪亞) 
2019: Juvenile A
2022: Discipline (調教)

Other albums
1997: The Night When Bad Guys Weren't So Bad (Live Album)
1997: Cannot Be Ignored Collection 1994–1997 (Best of Album)
2000: Sandee Chan Collection 1994–1999 (Best of Album)
2004: Happy Together 2003 (Live Album)
2004: An Addiction Of Beauty (Live Album)
2004: Material-Girl Coin (Sandee + Li Duan Xian + Wang Ke Le Album)
2005: Material-girls.com 2005 (Sandee + Li Duan Xian + Wang Ke Le Album)
2009: What If It Matters (English Album)
2009: A Tale of Two Chens (Sandee + Kimmy EP)
2011: 19 (Sandee + Chen Chien Chi Album)

Awards 
Chan was awarded Best Album and Best Album Producer at the 16th Golden Melody Awards in 2005.

At the 20th Golden Melody Awards in 2009, she won Best Mandarin Female Singer.

References

External links 
 

1970 births
Living people
Taiwanese pop singers
Taiwanese women singer-songwriters
National Chengchi University alumni
Musicians from Taipei
Filipino emigrants to Taiwan
Writers from Taipei
21st-century Taiwanese women singers
Taiwanese women record producers
20th-century Taiwanese women singers